Mark Knowles and Brian MacPhie were the defending champions but they competed with different partners that year, Knowles with Daniel Nestor and MacPhie with Nenad Zimonjić.

MacPhie and Zimonjić lost in the semifinals to Mahesh Bhupathi and Max Mirnyi.

Knowles and Nestor won in the final 7–6(7–4), 6–7(5–7), 6–4 against Bhupathi and Mirnyi.

Seeds
The top four seeded teams received byes into the second round.

Draw

Finals

Top half

Bottom half

External links
 2002 RCA Championships Doubles Draw

RCA Championships - Doubles
2002 RCA Championships